The Western Japan Bowl is an annual American college football bowl game, usually played in December in Japan. The game is a quarterfinal matchup to determine the top team in the West Japan bracket for the right to go to the Koshien Bowl.

Game results

References

External links
 

American football in Japan
Annual sporting events in Japan
College football bowls